"Camp Refoogee" is the first episode of the third season and the twenty-fourth overall episode of the animated comedy series American Dad!. It aired on Fox in the United States on September 10, 2006, and is written by Josh Bycel and Jonathan Fener and directed by Albert Calleros.

In the episode, Stan's determined to send a reluctant Steve to summer camp. The only one he finds is in Africa, and it is a refugee camp. Back in Langley Falls, Francine and Roger pretend to be a married couple at events around town, but they can't agree on their backstory. At the refugee camp, Stan and Hayley arrive to take Steve back to Langley Falls, but Stan decides to stay for a while and run the place as a summer camp.

Plot
When Stan tries to persuade Steve to go to summer camp, Steve refuses, wanting instead to stay home and spend time gardening.  Stan does not give up, however; upon learning that a camping supply store is donating its equipment to a camp, he sends Steve along with it. Steve tells Stan that he was not in Boyz II Men. Francine then learns that Stan actually sent their son to an African refugee camp (which Stan mispronounces as "re-foo-gee") and demands that he bring Steve home.  Wanting to help the refugees, Hayley also tags along.

Once in Africa, Hayley discovers the workers feasting while the refugees are starving, and tries to protest. However, after finding out that she will be staying in Africa for a while, she quickly joins them. Meanwhile, Stan turns the refugee camp into a summer camp so Steve can have some kind of camp experience.  Steve meets Makeva, an African girl about his age, but then gets annoyed when his dad keeps bothering him.  Just then, a group of rebels kidnaps Makeva.  Stan then suggests a "Camp-a-lympics" to the rebels, saying that if his team wins, the refugees get Makeva and their land back. Back home, Roger and Francine amuse themselves in town, pretending to be a professor and his wife. They meet another  couple and invite them home, and the subplot becomes a parody of Who's Afraid of Virginia Woolf?, resulting in a bloody fight which wrecks the living room.

At the Camp-a-lympics, the score is tied going into the final event, a foot race between Steve and the rebel leader.  Steve wins the event, but Makeva runs into the arms of the rebel leader, whom she has already fallen for.  Stan then tells a dejected Steve that his first camp love dumped him too.  As they fly home, Hayley, who had spent all of her time eating at the UN headquarters there instead of helping the refugees, says she thinks she "gained the African twenty," while Steve thanks his dad for an "awesome" camp experience.

Reception
Daniel Solomon of Cinema Blend gave the episode a mixed review, saying "Camp Refoogee" "in which Stan’s zeal to help his son grow up the right way leads him to send Steve to a refugee camp in Africa. Instead of correcting the mistake, Stan joins him and helps turn the place into Meatballs or Heavyweights, depending on how young you are. Like with all the jokes in American Dad, it could be better if the movies the episode parodies aren’t mentioned. But so powerful is the writers’ need to spew pop culture knowledge from every orifice that Stan makes direct reference to them several times. Hey kids! I remember Short Circuit! Isn't that hysterical?" The episode was watched by a total of 8.93 million people; this made it the third most watched show on Animation Domination that night, losing to Family Guy and The Simpsons, which had 11.6 million viewers.

References

External links 
 

2006 American television episodes
American Dad! (season 3) episodes
Summer camps in television